Leslie is a village in west central Franklin County, Missouri, United States. The population was 171 at the 2010 census.

Geography
Leslie is located along US Route 50 between Gerald approximately five miles to the west and Beaufort 1.5 miles to the east.

Demographics

2010 census
As of the census of 2010, there were 171 people, 50 households, and 36 families living in the village. The racial makeup of the village was 96.5% White, 0.6% Native American, and 2.9% from two or more races. Hispanic or Latino people of any race were 2.3% of the population.

There were 50 households, of which 48.0% had children under the age of 18 living with them, 48.0% were married couples living together, 16.0% had a female householder with no husband present, 8.0% had a male householder with no wife present, and 28.0% were non-families. 18.0% of all households were made up of individuals, and 2% had someone living alone who was 65 years of age or older. The average household size was 3.42 and the average family size was 4.00.

The median age in the village was 25.8 years. 37.4% of residents were under the age of 18; 11.1% were between the ages of 18 and 24; 28.7% were from 25 to 44; 18.7% were from 45 to 64; and 4.1% were 65 years of age or older. The gender makeup of the village was 48.0% male and 52.0% female.

2000 census
As of the census of 2000, there were 87 people, 35 households, and 19 families living in the village. The racial makeup of the village was 100.00% White.

There were 35 households, out of which 31.4% had children under the age of 18 living with them, 34.3% were married couples living together, 8.6% had a female householder with no husband present, and 42.9% were non-families. 37.1% of all households were made up of individuals, and 22.9% had someone living alone who was 65 years of age or older. The average household size was 2.49 and the average family size was 3.15.

In the village, the population was spread out, with 29.9% under the age of 18, 11.5% from 18 to 24, 27.6% from 25 to 44, 20.7% from 45 to 64, and 10.3% who were 65 years of age or older. The median age was 36 years. For every 100 females, there were 117.5 males. For every 100 females age 18 and over, there were 103.3 males.

The median income for a household in the village was $29,250, and the median income for a family was $36,250. Males had a median income of $25,500 versus $17,917 for females. The per capita income for the village was $13,140. There were 15.8% of families and 12.4% of the population living below the poverty line, including no under eighteens and 22.2% of those over 64.

Notable person

 Frank Saucier, Major League Baseball player

References

Villages in Franklin County, Missouri
Villages in Missouri